is a city in western Toyama Prefecture, Japan. , the city had an estimated population of 48,275 in 17632 households, and a population density of 210 persons per km². Himi is known primarily for its commercial fishing industry. The city was founded on August 1, 1952.

Geography
Himi is in the far northwestern Toyama Prefecture, and is bordered by Ishikawa Prefecture (the Noto Peninsula to the west and north, and the Sea of Japan (Toyama Bay) to the east. Much of the area is a dispersed settlement typical of this region of Japan.

Surrounding municipalities
Toyama Prefecture
 Takaoka
Ishikawa Prefecture
 Nanao
 Hakui
 Hōdatsushimizu
 Nakanoto

Climate
Himi has a humid continental climate (Köppen Cfa) characterized by mild summers and cold winters with heavy snowfall.  The average annual temperature in Himi is 13.9 °C. The average annual rainfall is 2409 mm with September as the wettest month. The temperatures are highest on average in August, at around 26.4 °C, and lowest in January, at around 2.8 °C.

Demographics
Per Japanese census data, the population of Himi has declined over the past 40 years.

History
The area of present-day Himi was part of ancient Etchū Province. The town of Himi was created within Imizu District, Toyama with the establishment of the municipalities system on April 1, 1889. Izumi District was divided on March 29, 1896 into Izumi District and Himi District. The town annexed the neighboring villages of Kanno and Inazumi in 1940, and the villages of Goishi, Yashiro, Yokawa in 1952. In 1953, the town further annexed the villages of Kubo, Miyata, Kamijo and Kumanashi. In 1954, Himi annexed the villages of Ao, Yabuta, Unami, Mera, Kume, Kojiro, Junicho, Hayakawa, Fuse, and Busshoji, so that in its final form it encompassed the entire district of Himi with the exception of the village of Ota (which was annexed by Takaoka).

Government
Himi has a mayor-council form of government with a directly elected mayor and a unicameral city legislature of 17 members.

Education
Himi has twelve public elementary schools and five public junior high schools operated by the town government, and one public high school operated by the Toyama Prefectural Board of Education.

Transportation

Railway
West Japan Railway Company (JR West) -  Himi Line
 -

Highway
Nōetsu Expressway

Regional Specialties
 Himi Udon
 Himi Buri
 Himi Beef
 Himi Iwashi
 Himi Curry
 Kintsuba
 Himi Hatomugi Tea
 Cold Yellowtail

Points of interest
 Himi Seaside Botanical Garden
 Himi Banya
 Shimao Seaside Park
 Ōzakai Cave Dwelling Site, a National Historic Site 
Yanaidanu-no-Oyama Kofun, a National Historic Site
Asahi Shell Mound, a National Historic Site

References

External links

Official Website 

 
Cities in Toyama Prefecture
Populated coastal places in Japan